Bogusław Radoszewski (c. 1577–1638) of Oksza coat of arms was a Polish noble and Roman Catholic priest. Born around 1577 at Siemkowice, he became the abbot of Order of Saint Benedict monastery Święty Krzyż on Łysa Góra, he was the Bishop of Kijów (Kyiv) from 1619 to February 1633, and afterwards Bishop of Łuck (Lutsk). He died in 1638.

In Modliborzyce, he sponsored the construction of  hospital. Radoszewski obtained royal permission to colonize the area along the Kamienna River.

References 

1638 deaths
People from Pajęczno County
16th-century Polish nobility
17th-century Roman Catholic bishops in the Polish–Lithuanian Commonwealth
Polish abbots
Year of birth uncertain
Ecclesiastical senators of the Polish–Lithuanian Commonwealth
Roman Catholic bishops of Kyiv
Benedictine abbots
Polish Benedictines
17th-century Polish nobility